Manuel Eguiguren Galarraga (January 1, 1930 – July 15, 2012) was the Roman Catholic titular bishop of Salapia and auxiliary bishop of the Vicariate Apostolic of El Beni or Beni, Bolivia.

Ordained to the priesthood in 1954, Eguiguren  Galarraga was named bishop in 1981 and retired in 2007.

Notes

21st-century Roman Catholic bishops in Bolivia
1930 births
2012 deaths
20th-century Roman Catholic bishops in Bolivia
Roman Catholic bishops of El Beni